The NATO Association of Canada (NAOC; formerly the Atlantic Council of Canada) is a non-governmental organization founded in 1966 to promote knowledge and understanding of the North Atlantic Treaty Organization (NATO) in Canada.

About
NAOC is a member of the Atlantic Treaty Association (ATA) headquartered in Brussels, Belgium, which coordinates some forty similar organization in other NATO member and Partnership for Peace (PFP) nations. The vision of NAOC is to promote the importance in cultural, security and economic terms of the transatlantic relationship among Canada, the United States and the nations of Europe, and be the premier sponsor and supporter of NATO in Canada.

, the NAOC is headed by its chairman, former Minister of Defence David Collenette, and the list of directors counts 51 persons. , day-to-day operations are overseen by the President and CEO, Robert Baines. The association operates from its national office in downtown Toronto, Ontario, with a small professional staff, including volunteers and interns, located across the country in Vancouver, Calgary and Montreal.

The association organizes and promotes conferences, seminars, roundtables, speakers' dinners and lunches, as well as an annual Spring Conference in Toronto and a Fall Conference in Ottawa. NAOC also releases several articles per week, on issues pertaining to peace, prosperity and security, to better educate Canadians about NATO.

References

External links
 

NATO relations
Political advocacy groups in Canada
Organizations established in 1966
Organizations based in Toronto
1966 establishments in Canada